Bedel is a surname. Notable people with the surname include:

Ernest Marie Louis Bedel (1849–1922), French entomologist
Maurice Bedel (1883–1954), French novelist and essayist
Timothy Bedel (1737–1787), American soldier and politician

French-language surnames